This is a list of members of the 55th Legislative Assembly of Queensland from 2015 to 2017, as elected at the 2015 election held on 31 January 2015.

 Cook MP Billy Gordon was expelled from the Labor Party on 29 March 2015 following media reports of undeclared criminal offences and domestic violence allegations.
 Cairns MP Rob Pyne resigned from the Labor Party on 7 March 2016.
 Toowoomba South MP John McVeigh resigned from parliament on 29 April 2016 to contest the federal seat of Groom at the 2016 federal election. David Janetzki was elected as his replacement at a by-election on 16 July 2016.
 Buderim MP Steve Dickson resigned from the Liberal National Party on 13 January 2017 and joined Pauline Hanson's One Nation.

Members of Queensland parliaments by term
21st-century Australian politicians